William Way (alias May, alias Flower) (died 1588) was an English Catholic priest and martyr executed under Elizabeth I after the Protestant Reformation. He is venerated in the Roman Catholic Church.

Early life and education
William Way was born in the Diocese of Exeter about c. 1560.  Bishop Richard Challoner said he was born in Cornwall, and earlier authorities say in Devonshire.

Since the Protestant Reformation had closed Catholic seminaries in England, Way went to France to study. On 31 March 1584, he received his first tonsure in the Cathedral of Reims from the Cardinal of Guise.  On 22 March he was ordained subdeacon, on 5 April deacon, and priest on 18 September 1586, at Laon, probably by Bishop Valentine Douglas (Valentine Duglas), O.S.B.

Career
Way departed for England on 9 December 1586, and by June 1587, was imprisoned. He was indicted at Newgate in September 1588, for being a Roman Catholic priest. He declined to be tried by a secular judge, whereupon the Bishop of London was sent for. Way, refusing to acknowledge him as a bishop or Elizabeth I as head of the Church, was immediately condemned as a traitor and to death.

He was austere. When called to trial at the Sessions in August, "he had so much joy that he seemed past himself". Way was "hung, drawn and quartered" at Kingston upon Thames. The date is variously given as either 23 September or 1 October 1588.

See also
Richard Flower

References

1588 deaths
16th-century English Roman Catholic priests
Martyred Roman Catholic priests
People executed under Elizabeth I by hanging, drawing and quartering
Venerated Catholics
Executed English people
16th-century Roman Catholic martyrs
16th-century venerated Christians
Year of birth unknown
One Hundred and Seven Martyrs of England and Wales